Kemblawarra is a residential, commercial and light industrial area of Wollongong, New South Wales, Australia.  It is officially designated an urban place, and comprises the south-eastern part of Warrawong (south of Northcliffe Drive) and the southern part of Port Kembla (south of Parkes Street.)

References

Suburbs of Wollongong